Maria Vyacheslavovna Minaeva (born 19 April 2005) is a Russian artistic gymnast and member of the Russian national gymnastics team.

Early life
Maria was born in Zelenodolsk, Russia in 2005.  She currently represents the Volga Federal District.

Gymnastics career

Junior

2019
In May Minaeva competed at the Russian National Championships where she placed eighth in the all-around. She placed sixth on uneven bars, fifth on balance beam, and fourth on floor exercise. In November Minaeva competed at Elite Gym Massilia where she placed fifteenth in the all-around.

Senior

2021 
Minaeva turned senior in 2021.  She competed at the national championships where she placed fifth in the all-around and fourth on uneven bars. At the Russian Cup she placed sixth in the all-around and on floor exercise. In September it was announced that Minaeva would compete at the upcoming World Championships alongside Angelina Melnikova, Vladislava Urazova, and Yana Vorona.  While there she only competed on the uneven bars.  She finished seventh in qualifications but did not advance to the final due to Melnikova and Urazova scoring higher.

2022 
Minaeva competed at the Doha World Cup in early March.  She qualified to the uneven bars and floor exercise finals.  During event finals she won silver on the uneven bars behind compatriot Viktoria Listunova.  While in Doha it was announced that starting March 7 Russian and Belarusian athletes would be banned from taking part in FIG-sanctioned competitions due to the 2022 Russian invasion of Ukraine.  During the floor exercise event final she won gold. During Spartakiada AA Maria injured her Achilles and was out of training several months.

2023

In February just before The Russian Championships she injured her elbow when was training new vault.￼￼

Competitive history

References

External links
 

2005 births
Living people
Russian female artistic gymnasts
Sportspeople from Tatarstan